Katharina Gerlach (born 19 February 1998) is a German tennis player.

She has won four singles and seven doubles titles on the ITF Circuit. On 25 April 2022, she reached her best singles ranking of world No. 217. On 2 July 2018, she peaked at No. 238 in the doubles rankings.

Gerlach made her WTA Tour debut at the 2015 Nürnberger Versicherungscup, partnering Lena Rüffer in doubles. They lost in the first round to eventual tournament champions, Chan Hao-ching and Anabel Medina Garrigues.

Performance timelines 

Only main-draw results in WTA Tour are included in win–loss records.

Singles 
Current through the 2022 WTA Tour.

ITF Circuit finals

Singles: 13 (4 titles, 9 runner–ups)

Doubles: 11 (7 titles, 4 runner–ups)

References

External links

 
 

1998 births
Living people
Sportspeople from Essen
German female tennis players
Tennis people from North Rhine-Westphalia